Un Año de Conciertos is a VHS video from the Mexican singer Luis Miguel. It was recorded in 1989 during the presentations of the artist by various places in Mexico after the release of his last album (at that time), Busca Una Mujer.

This video records (as the same title and an explanation in the video by Luis Miguel) one year of presentations. The video contains around 80 minutes of the concerts, and the other 5 minutes include an interview that Luis Miguel made specially for the video. The interview is cut and put in some parts of the video sequentially.

Song List
Presentation
Soy Como Quiero Ser
Sunny
Yesterday
Es Mejor
Culpable o No
Ahora Te Puedes Marchar
Pupilas de Gato
Soy Un Perdedor
Cucurrucucú Paloma
La Incondicional
Perdoname
Yo Que No Vivo Sin Ti
Isabel
Separados
Por Favor Señora
Un Hombre Busca Una Mujer
Entregate
Palabra de Honor
Cuando Calienta el Sol

Luis Miguel video albums
1989 video albums
1989 live albums
Live video albums
Warner Records video albums
Warner Records live albums